Avi Arad (born 1948) is an Israeli-American film producer who became the CEO of the company Toy Biz in the 1990s and soon afterward became the chief creative officer of Marvel Entertainment, and the chairman, CEO, and founder of Marvel Studios. Since then, he has produced a wide array of live-action, animated, and television comic book adaptations including Spider-Man: Into the Spider-Verse, the 2018 Academy Award winner for Best Animated Feature.

Early life 
Arad was born in 1948 in Ramat Gan, Israel, to a Jewish family. The son of Holocaust survivors from Poland, he grew up reading Superman and Spider-Man comics translated into Hebrew. In 1965, he was conscripted as a soldier into the Israel Defense Forces (IDF). He fought and was wounded in the 1967 Six-Day War, and spent 15 days recuperating. Arad finished his military service in 1968.

In 1970, Arad moved to the United States and enrolled at Hofstra University to study industrial management. He worked as a truck driver and as a Hebrew teacher to put himself through college, and graduated with a BBA in 1972.

Career

Marvel Comics 
Along with Israeli-American Toy Biz co-owner Isaac Perlmutter, Avi Arad came into conflict with Carl Icahn and Ron Perelman over control of Marvel Comics in the wake of its 1996 bankruptcy. In the end, Arad and Perlmutter came out on top, with Toy Biz taking over Marvel Comics in a complicated deal that included obtaining the rights to Spider-Man and other superheroes that Marvel had sold earlier. He was involved in Marvel's emergence from bankruptcy and the expansion of the company's profile through licensing and movies.

Arad Productions 
On May 31, 2006, Arad resigned his various Marvel positions, including his leadership of Marvel Studios, to form his own production company, Arad Productions (also known as Arad Animation), a company that primarily produces Marvel-licensed films separate from the Marvel Cinematic Universe. His first non-Marvel film was 2007's Bratz. Further ventures include: manga adaptation Ghost in the Shell; an adaption of Brandon Mull's best-seller teenage fantasy, Fablehaven (which died in production); an adaption of James Patterson's award-winning teenage novel Maximum Ride; the adaptations of two Sony PlayStation properties, Uncharted and infamous, and an adaptation of the video game Metal Gear Solid.

Production I.G 
On August 25, 2010, it was announced that Arad was given a chair with the American branch of animation studio Production I.G in Los Angeles, California.

Filmography

Feature films

Direct-to-video

Television

References

External links 

1948 births
Hofstra University alumni
Israeli emigrants to the United States
Israeli Ashkenazi Jews
Israeli soldiers
Living people
Marvel Entertainment people
Marvel Studios people
American film producers
Israeli film producers
American chief executives
Israeli chief executives
American people of Polish-Jewish descent
Israeli people of Polish-Jewish descent
American Ashkenazi Jews
People from Givatayim
Marvel Comics people
Sony Pictures Animation people